Erick Rodríguez (born 1 June 1990) is a Nicaraguan middle-distance runner competing in the 1500 metres and 3000 metres steeplechase. He represented his country at the 2015 World Championships and 2016 World Indoor Championships without advancing from the first round.

He competed for Nicaragua at the 2016 Summer Olympics in the men's 1500 m event. He finished 15th in his heat and did not qualify for the semifinals. He was the flag bearer for Nicaragua during the closing ceremony.

He is the national record holder in the 1500 metres both outdoors and indoors.

Competition record

Personal bests
Outdoor
1500 metres – 3:49.64 (Beijing 2015)
5000 metres – 15:33.51 (San José 2011)
3000 metres steeplechase – 9:10.29 (Managua 2015)
Indoor
1500 metres – 3:58.37 (Portland 2016)

References

1990 births
Living people
Nicaraguan male middle-distance runners
Male steeplechase runners
Nicaraguan steeplechase runners
Olympic athletes of Nicaragua
People from Jinotega Department
World Athletics Championships athletes for Nicaragua
Athletes (track and field) at the 2016 Summer Olympics
Pan American Games competitors for Nicaragua
Athletes (track and field) at the 2015 Pan American Games
Central American Games gold medalists for Nicaragua
Central American Games medalists in athletics
Central American Games bronze medalists for Nicaragua
Competitors at the 2014 Central American and Caribbean Games